Richard Raatzsch (born 1957 in Halle an der Saale, Germany) is a German philosopher. Since 2008, he has been Chair of Ethics within the European Business School (EBS) at Reichartshausen Castle in Oestrich-Winkel/Rheingau (Germany).

Life 
Raatzsch studied philosophy and history at Martin-Luther-Universität Halle-Wittenberg (Germany). After earning his Ph.D. at that institution, he pursued a teaching and research career at the University of Leipzig, first at the Institute for Logic and Philosophy of Science ("Institut für Logik und Wissenschaftstheorie"), and subsequently at the Institute for Philosophy ("Institut für Philosophie"). In 1999, he earned the habilitation degree for a study of Ludwig Wittgenstein's Philosophical Investigations; the study was published in book form under the title Eigentlich Seltsames. Wittgensteins Philosophische Untersuchungen. Ein Kommentar (Something Strange. Wittgenstein's Philosophical Investigations. A Commentary) in 2003.

In 2004, Raatzsch served as Chair of Political Philosophy and Philosophical Anthropology at the University of Potsdam (Germany). He also taught at the universities of St Gallen (Switzerland) and Bergen (Norway). From 2006 to 2008, a Heisenberg Grant enabled him to do research at Cambridge University (UK); since then, he has been a "life member" of Clare Hall College Cambridge (UK). From 1996 on, Raatzsch has been editor of the international periodical Wittgenstein Studies.

Major research areas 

 Philosophy of Language
 Philosophy of Mind
 Metaphilosophy
 Ethics
 Political Philosophy

Books 

 Philosophiephilosophie [Philosophy of Philosophy]. Reclam, Stuttgart 2000
 Eigentlich Seltsames. Wittgensteins Philosophische Untersuchungen. Ein Kommentar [Something Strange. Wittgenstein's Philosophical Investigations. A Commentary]. Vol. 1: Einleitung und Kommentar PU 1-64. Schöningh, Paderborn – Munich – Zurich 2003
 Autorität und Autonomie [Authority and Autonomy]. mentis, Paderborn 2007
 Apologizing Evil: Iago's Case. Princeton University Press, Princeton – Oxford 2009

References

External links
 
 Richard Raatzsch University Website

1957 births
Living people
German philosophers
University of Wittenberg alumni